Stephen Papps is an actor from New Zealand. He trained at the Academy Corporate Theatre Actors Workshop and the Wellington Performing Arts Centre, New Zealand.

Career

Stephen Papps has appeared in projects that range from the critically acclaimed stage productions The 39 Steps and Mark Twain & Me In Maoriland to the feature films The Piano and Braindead. His television appearances include such series as perennial favourite Shortland Street and Disney's Legend of the Seeker. Stephen also wrote and performed the highly regarded BLOWING IT, which he performed world-wide and for which he was nominated for a Chapman Tripp theatre award.

He began his career in 1991 with the award-winning feature The End of the Golden Weather, for which he won best actor. In Russian Snark, Papps played the lead role of Misha, a Latvian-born Russian filmmaker whose career has seen better days. He was nominated for best actor at the Maverick Film awards 2011 and the New Zealand Film Awards 2010.

Filmography

Theatre

References

External links

Living people
New Zealand male film actors
New Zealand male television actors
Year of birth missing (living people)
New Zealand male soap opera actors
20th-century New Zealand male actors
21st-century New Zealand male actors